Sundair is a German charter airline which is headquartered in Stralsund and based at Berlin Brandenburg Airport, Bremen Airport, Dresden Airport and Kassel Airport.

History
In September 2017, the airline received its air operator's certificate and commenced operations on 1 July 2017 with flights to Heraklion and Hurghada. After the demise of Germania - an airline for which Sundair had previously operated wet leases - in early 2019, Sundair announced it would base aircraft at Dresden Airport and Bremen Airport and take over several of Germania's routes.

In July 2021, Sundair leased one A319 from Croatia Airlines over summer 2021. The jet is based in Leipzig.

Destinations
Sundair operates flights from Germany to holiday destinations in The Mediterranean and North Africa mainly from Berlin Brandenburg Airport, Bremen Airport, Dresden Airport and Kassel Airport. As of September 2021, the airline serves the following charter destinations:

Bulgaria
 Varna - Varna Airport
 Burgas - Burgas Airport

Croatia
 Bol - Brač

Egypt
 Hurghada - Hurghada International Airport
 Marsa Alam - Marsa Alam International Airport

Germany
 Berlin - Berlin Brandenburg Airport, base
 Bremen - Bremen Airport, base
 Düsseldorf - Düsseldorf Airport, base
 Dresden - Dresden Airport, base
 Kassel - Kassel Airport, base
 Leipzig/Halle - Leipzig/Halle Airport, base
 Lübeck - Lübeck Airport

Greece
 Corfu - Corfu Airport
 Kos - Kos Airport
 Rhodes - Rhodes Airport
 Heraklion - Heraklion International Airport
 Thessaloniki - Thessaloniki International Airport

Lebanon
 Beirut - Rafic Hariri International Airport

Spain
 Fuerteventura - Fuerteventura Airport
 Mallorca - Palma de Mallorca Airport
 Gran Canaria - Gran Canaria Airport
 Tenerife - Tenerife South Airport

Turkey
 Antalya - Antalya Airport

Fleet

As of May 2022, Sundair operates the following aircraft:

References

External links

 

Airlines of Germany
Airlines established in 2016